Walter Broughton (born October 20, 1962) is a former American football wide receiver. He played for the Buffalo Bills from 1986 to 1988.

References

1962 births
Living people
American football wide receivers
Jacksonville State Gamecocks football players
Michigan Panthers players
New Jersey Generals players
Buffalo Bills players
People from Brewton, Alabama
Players of American football from Alabama